Core FTP is a freeware secure FTP client for Windows, developed by CoreFTP.com. Features include FTP, SSL/TLS, SFTP via SSH, and HTTP/HTTPS support. Secure FTP clients encrypt account information and data transferred across the internet, protecting data from being seen or sniffed across networks. Core FTP is a traditional FTP client with local files displayed on the left, remote files on the right.

Core FTP Server is a secure FTP server for Windows, developed by CoreFTP.com, starting in 2010.

Licensing
CoreFTP LE is free for personal, educational, non-profit, and business use.

See also
 Comparison of FTP client software 
 List of FTP server software

Reviews and references
 PC Magazine – 59 Ways to Supercharge Windows –  Odds & Ends – Core FTP LE
 Softpedia.com – Reviews – "Today, try Core FTP Lite!" – By: Codrut Nistor, Editor, Software Reviews

References

External links
 Official website

FTP clients
SSH File Transfer Protocol clients
Cryptographic software
Application software
File transfer software